Translational Psychiatry is a peer-reviewed medical journal published by Nature Publishing Group. It is a sister journal to the better-known Molecular Psychiatry. While both journals cover the larger field of biological psychiatry, Translational Psychiatry is more focused on translational aspects of research. It was launched on April 5, 2011, when the editor-in-chief of both journals, Julio Licinio, announced it during the First National Symposium on Translational Psychiatry at The Australian National University. One of the first articles was a guest editorial by Thomas Insel, who stated that "Translational Psychiatry has an opportunity to make a difference by publishing the best science at a time when we can see this historic bridge being built that will link science, practice and policy. I, for one, will watch (and read) with enthusiasm." Translational Psychiatry has been criticized for requiring author fees to submit critiques of articles published in the journal since this could insulate articles from critics.

Abstracting and indexing 
The journal is abstracted and indexed in:

References

External links 
 

Nature Research academic journals
Psychiatry journals
Publications established in 2011
Open access journals
English-language journals
Creative Commons Attribution-licensed journals
Continuous journals